Mubarak Al-Beloushi (born 6 July 1987) is a Kuwaiti footballer who is a defender for the VIVA Premier League club Al Arabi SC.

He played for Al-Arabi in the 2007 AFC Champions League group stage.

Honors

Al Arabi SC
Kuwait Emir Cup:1 2007-08
Kuwait Crown Prince Cup:3 2006-07 2011-12 2014-15
Kuwait Super Cup:2 2008, 2012
Kuwait Federation Cup:1 2013-14

References

1987 births
Living people
Kuwaiti footballers
Al-Arabi SC (Kuwait) players
Sportspeople from Kuwait City
Kuwait international footballers
Association football defenders
Muscat Club players
Kuwait Premier League players
Kuwaiti expatriate sportspeople in Oman
Kuwaiti expatriate footballers
Expatriate footballers in Oman